Robustus, robust in Latin, may refer to:

 Atheris squamiger robustus, a subspecies in the species Atheris squamigera, the green bush viper, variable bush viper or leaf viper, a viper species found in west and central Africa
 Cebus nigritus robustus, a subspecies in the species Cebus nigritus, the black capuchin, a monkey from the Atlantic Forest in south-eastern Brazil and far north-eastern Argentina
 Paranthropus robustus, an extinct species of hominine, also previously mistakenly referred to as Australopithecus robustus

See also
 Robusta (disambiguation)